Mahmud Pasha Angelović (1420–1474) was the Grand Vizier of the Ottoman Empire from 1456 to 1466 and again from 1472 to 1474, who also wrote Persian and Turkish poems under the pseudonym Adni (the "Eden-like").

Born in the Serbian Despotate, he was a descendant of the Byzantine Angelos family that had left Thessaly in 1394. According to biographers, he was conscripted as a child by the Ottomans employing the devşirme system. Raised as a Muslim in Edirne, he was a capable soldier and was married to a daughter of Zaganos Pasha. After distinguishing himself at the Siege of Belgrade in 1456, he was raised to the position of Grand Vizier as a reward, succeeding his father-in-law Zaganos Pasha. Throughout his tenure, he led armies or accompanied Mehmed II on his own campaigns.

Origin and early life
After the Ottoman conquest of Thessaly in 1394, the ruling Angeloi Philanthropenoi family took refuge. The grandchildren of either Alexios or Manuel were Mahmud Pasha and his brother Mihailo Anđelović.

It is estimated that Angelović was born in the early 1420s. Most historians accept that Angelović was born in Novo Brdo in the Serbian Despotate, and that his father Mihailos was the son of either Alexios Angelos Philanthropenos or his son/nephew/brother Manuel, rulers of Thessaly. T. Stavrides views it more probable that Manuel was his grandfather. The only information on his father is that he lived in Serbia in the 1420s. His mother's ancestry is the matter of debate. Chalkokondyles (1430–1470) called her Serbian, Kritoboulos (1410–1470), Greek, while there are various theories on her noble ancestry. Angelović had a brother, Mihailo Anđelović, later a prominent Serbian statesman, after the Turkish conquest.

According to Tahsin Yazıcı, Angelović was "born to a Greek or Serbian family".

Chalkokondyles mentions that Angelović was captured by Ottoman horsemen while travelling with his mother from Novo Brdo to Smederevo (the Serbian capital), and taken to the Ottoman court. It is assumed that this took place in 1427, when the Ottomans attacked Serbia. Furthermore, it is unconcluded whether he was captured according to the devşirme(practice, the regular practice of taking children certain noble families whose Ottomans have taken lands and making these children high rankings officials) or as a prisoner of war. Taşköprüzade (d. 1560) and Aşık Çelebi (1520–1572) name two other boys led with Angelović on horseback to Edirne, Molla Iyas and Mevlana Abdülkerim, the latter which reached the rank of kadıasker (chief judge) and şeyhülislam (Islamic scholar). Upon conversion to Islam, he received the name Mahmud.

Little is known about his activities before 1453. According to T. Stavrides, Angelović and his companions were educated in the palace, probably as içoğlan, and Mahmud then entered service in the Enderûn, later serving prince Mehmed, the future sultan. Sources do not agree on which posts he held at the palace.

Life

Mahmud Pasha was a capable soldier. After distinguishing himself at the siege of Belgrade (1456), he was raised to the position of Grand Vizier as a reward, succeeding Zaganos Pasha. Throughout his tenure he led armies or accompanied Mehmed II on his own campaigns.

In 1458, the Serbian Despot Lazar Branković died. Mahmud's brother Mihailo became member of a collective regency, but he was soon deposed by the anti-Ottoman and pro-Hungarian faction in the Serbian court. In reaction, Mahmud attacked and seized Smederevo Fortress, although the citadel held out, and seized some additional strongholds in its vicinity. Threatened by a possible Hungarian intervention however he was forced to withdraw south and join the forces of Sultan Mehmed II at Skopje. In 1461, he accompanied Mehmed in his campaign against the Empire of Trebizond, the last surviving fragment of the Byzantine Empire. Mahmud negotiated the surrender of the city of Trebizond with the protovestiarios, the scholar George Amiroutzes, who was also his cousin.

In 1463, Mahmud led the invasion and conquest of the Kingdom of Bosnia, even though a peace treaty between Bosnia and the Ottomans had just been renewed. He captured the Bosnian king, Stephen Tomašević, at Ključ, and obtained from him the cession of the country to the Empire.

Angelović accompanied Mehmed II when he attacked Albania Veneta in the summer of 1467, and ravaged the lands. For 15 days he pursued Skanderbeg, who was a Venetian ally at the time, but failed to find him, as Skanderbeg retreated into the mountains and then succeeded in fleeing to the coast. According to Tursun Beg and Ibn Kemal, Angelović swam over Bojana, attacked Venetian-controlled Scutari, and plundered the surrounding area.

Mahmud was dismissed in 1468 due to the machinations of his successor, Rum Mehmed Pasha, ostensibly due to irregularities regarding the resettlement of the Karamanids in Constantinople following the conquest of Karaman earlier in that year. He was reinstated in 1472, but his relations with the Sultan were now strained. Mahmud was fired and executed in 1474. The cause was the suspicion that he was involved in the sudden death of Şehzade Mustafa, the favorite son of Sultan Mehmed II. It was said that Şehzade Mustafa had an affair with Mahmud's wife, Selçuk Hatun (sister of Hatice Hatun, the youngest consort of Mehmed II) and that Mahmud poisoned him for it. Mahmud denied it but, even without proof, Mehmed II still decided to execute him.

Literary output
Mahmud Pasha wrote works in Persian and Turkish with "Adni" as his pen name. The  divan he composed includes 45 ghazals and 21 mofrads in Persian, as well as "some rather successful naziras on the ghazals of Zahir Faryabi and Hafez". Tahsin Yazıcı adds that Mahmud Pasha "also wrote a number of official letters in Persian".

Family
He married Selçuk Hatun, daughter of Zaganos Pasha by his first wife Sitti Nefise Hatun, and they had a son named Ali Bey and a daughter named Hatice Hatun. His wife became lover to Şehzade Mustafa, son of Sultan Mehmed II. For this reason, Mahmud was suspected of involvement in Mustafa's death and executed.

References

Sources
 
 
 
 
 

Grand Viziers of Mehmed the Conqueror
15th-century Grand Viziers of the Ottoman Empire
Kapudan Pashas
Military personnel of the Ottoman Empire
Ottoman people of the Ottoman–Venetian Wars
Pashas
1420 births
1474 deaths
15th-century Serbian people
15th-century Greek people
People from the Ottoman Empire of Serbian descent
People from the Ottoman Empire of Greek descent
People from Novo Brdo
Executed people from the Ottoman Empire
Executed Serbian people
15th-century executions by the Ottoman Empire
Converts to Islam from Eastern Orthodoxy
Former Serbian Orthodox Christians
1450s in the Ottoman Empire
1460s in the Ottoman Empire
1470s in the Ottoman Empire
Ottoman period in the history of Bosnia and Herzegovina
15th-century Persian-language writers
Turkish-language writers
Kosovo Serbs